The 2017–18 Nemzeti Bajnokság III is Hungary's third-level football competition.

On 20 June 2017, the play-offs finished and the full tables were formed. On 26 June 2017, it was announced that the Hungarian Football Federation did not accept the of Szigetszentmiklósi TK. On 12 July 2017, the Hungarian Football Federation issued the three groups of the 2017–18 season.

On 28 March 2018, the STC Salgótarján announced its withdrawal from the 2017–18 Nemzeti Bajnokság III season.

The results for STC Salgótarján were deleted for the entire season due to their withdrawal.

Teams

Changes

Standings

West

Centre

East

Season statistics

Top goalscorers - West

Updated to games played on 3 June 2018

Promotion and relegation play-off
Promoted: Taksony, Méhkeréki SE and Sényő qualified on slots.
The following champions did not assume the Nemzeti Bajnokság III, although they won their county championships: Tolna, Algyő and Pécsvárad

2nd leg

See also
 2017–18 Magyar Kupa
 2018 Magyar Kupa Final
 2017–18 Nemzeti Bajnokság I
 2017–18 Nemzeti Bajnokság II
 2017–18 Megyei Bajnokság I

References

External links
  
  

Nemzeti Bajnokság III seasons
2017–18 in Hungarian football
Hun